"Pop Goes My Love"/"Scratch Goes My Dub" is a single recorded for Beggars Banquet Records by British group Freeez. It was produced by Arthur Baker and featured on the album Gonna Get You. The song reached #26 in the UK Singles Chart. In the United States, the single reached #47 on the Billboard R&B singles chart and #5 in the Hot Dance Club Play chart.

Track listing

1983 releases
12" vinyl
 US: Streetwise / SWRL-2215
vinyl label reads, "Recorded & Mixed at Unique Studios, N.Y."

7" vinyl
 UK, Spanish and German

Charts

Credits
Written by Maas, Rocca, Stennett, and Baker
Produced and mixed by Arthur Baker
Mixed at Unique
Engineers: Frank Heller, Jay Burnett
Recorded at Unique, Vanguard; Daily Planet, New York City

References and notes

"Pop Goes My Love", 7" single on web Discogs.com

See also
Freeez
Freeez discography

1983 singles
Freeez songs
Songs written by Arthur Baker (musician)